Binani Industries Ltd is an Indian business group based in Mumbai. It belongs to the Braj Binani Group. The business portfolio of Binani Industries includes sectors like cement, zinc, glass-fiber, and downstream composite products.

Binani Industries holds the following subsidiaries: 
 Binani Cement Ltd - Cement
 Binani Zinc Ltd - Electrolytic Zinc
 Goa Glass Fiber Ltd. - Glass Fiber
Binani Industries holds operations in sales, manufacturing, and R&D in Asia, Europe, Middle East and North America.

References

Manufacturing companies based in Mumbai
Conglomerate companies established in 1872
Conglomerate companies of India
Companies listed on the Bombay Stock Exchange
Companies listed on the National Stock Exchange of India